Cotoneaster kweitschoviensis is a species of flowering plant in the family Rosaceae.

Description
It has a pilose and strigose apex with acute sepals which are either acuminate or obtuse the border of which is broad and can be villous and strigose at the same time. The flowers bloom from May to June, while fruits ripe from in November.

References

kweitschoviensis